When Night Falls is a docudrama from Chinese independent film director Ying Liang. The film is based on the real-life criminal case of Yang Jia, a Chinese man who killed six police officers after being arrested and beaten for riding a bicycle without a license. After the film's screening, threats of arrest from Chinese authorities resulted in Ying being exiled from Shanghai. Ying won best director at the Locarno Film Festival.

Plot summary
The film focuses on a partly fictionalized account of the real-life case of a Chinese man who killed six policemen after he was continually harassed by them. The incident started after he was beaten and taken into custody for riding a bicycle without a license. The plot is from his mother's perspective.

Production
The film is based on the criminal case of a Chinese man named Yang Jia, who was arrested and beaten because he rode a bicycle without a license. Despite repeated complaints by Yang Jia, the police would not stop their harassment. As a result, Yang Jia killed six policemen with a knife and later received a death sentence. Film director Ying Liang said that he could relate to the incident and said, "When I was 11, my father was kept away from home for three years. And my mother's reaction to this family disaster is unforgettable."

The finished film was first screened at the Joenju International Film Festival in May 2012. Subsequently, while Ying was in South Korea, he heard from his mother through a phone call that he would be arrested if he returned to Shanghai. Reportedly, policemen arrived to talk to Ying's family in Shanghai several times while using "intimidating words". Chinese authorities also offered to buy the film's rights from its South Korean owner for $5 million. Ying is still exiled from Shanghai and currently lives in Hong Kong.

Reception
Stephen Dalton, writing for The Hollywood Reporter, wrote, "In the light of such state-sponsored bullying, it feels churlish to criticize When Night Falls for its minimal entertainment value. But the pacing is painfully slow in places, while the lack of factual background seems to undermine Ying’s intention to illuminate an infamous injustice".

Richard Brody of The New Yorker said, "It’s a marvellous work of cinematic art, but it’s also a horrifically fascinating and deeply poignant view of a non-independent judicial system at work: its subject, in effect, is procedural injustice".

Ying was awarded best director at the Locarno Film Festival, while An Nai won best actress.

See also 
 List of TV and films with critiques of Chinese Communist Party

References

External links

Chinese independent films
Chinese docudrama films
2012 films